Edward Claude Seeley (May 25, 1884 – September 25, 1969) was a Canadian politician. He served in the Legislative Assembly of New Brunswick as member of the Progressive Conservative party from 1945 to 1948.

References

1884 births
1969 deaths
20th-century Canadian politicians
Progressive Conservative Party of New Brunswick MLAs
People from Sunbury County, New Brunswick